Prognathodes guezei, or Gueze's butterflyfish, is a species of marine ray-finned fish, a butterflyfish belonging to the family Chaetodontidae. It is found in the Western Indian Ocean, from Réunion Island, and Mauritius to the Comoros Islands.

Etymology
The fish is named in honor of marine biologist Paul Guézé, who collected the holotype specimen and helped collect even more paratype specimens.

References

Allen, G.R., R. Steene and M. Allen, 1998. A guide to angelfishes and butterflyfishes. Odyssey Publishing/Tropical Reef Research. 250 p.

guezei
Taxa named by André L. Maugé
Taxa named by Marie-Louise Bauchot
Fish described in 1976